Histioneis is a genus of dinoflagellates. According to the World Register of Marine Species, it contains 86 species.

References

Further reading

Dinoflagellate genera